Richard Prince (born 1949) is an American painter and photographer.

'Richard Prince may also refer to:

Richard Archer Prince (1865–1936), British actor who murdered William Terriss
Richard Prince (journalist) (born 1947), African-American journalist
Richard Prince (MP), Member of Parliament (MP) for Bridgnorth and Ludlow

See also 
Prince Richard (disambiguation)